The following is a list of Estonian composers of classical music.

A

B

E

G

H

J

K

L

M

N

O

P

R

S

T

U

V

W 
Adalbert Wirkhaus (1880–1961)

See also 
Music of Estonia

External links
 Estonian Music Information Centre

Estonia
 List
Composers